LP is the debut album by the band Discovery, released July 7, 2009 on vinyl on July 14, 2009 on CD via XL Recordings.

Reception

Initial critical response to LP was generally favorable.

Track listing

Personnel
Rostam Batmanglij – vocals, drum and synth programming and playing
Wes Miles – vocals, drum and synth programming and playing

References

2009 debut albums
Discovery (band) albums
XL Recordings albums
Albums produced by Rostam Batmanglij